A variety of eating utensils have been used by people to aid eating when dining. Most societies traditionally use bowls or dishes to contain food to be eaten, but while some use their hands to deliver this food to their mouths, others have developed specific tools for the purpose. In Western cultures, cutlery items such as knives and forks are the traditional norm, while in much of the East, chopsticks are more common. Spoons are ubiquitous.

History

In some cultures, such as Ethiopian and Indian, hands alone are used or bread takes the place of non-edible utensils. In others, such as Japanese and Chinese, where bowls of food are more often raised to the mouth, little modification from the basic pair of chopsticks and a spoon has taken place. Western culture has taken the development and specialization of eating utensils further, with the result that multiple utensils may appear in a dining setting, each with a different name and purpose. With the evolution of people's eating habits, further modification continues to take place, mostly in the West.

List of utensil types
 Spoon – List of types of spoons
 Fork – Western/Southeast Asian utensils
 Knife
 Chopsticks – East and Southeast Asian utensil
 Skewer
 Tongs
 Toothpick
 Cocktail stick
 Drinking straw
 Cutlery – A set of Western utensils: usually knife, fork and spoon
 Sujeo – A paired set of Korean utensils: a spoon and chopsticks
 Food pusher - a utensil with a blade set at 90° to the handle, used for pushing food onto a spoon or fork

Utensils for specific foods

Some utensils are designed for eating or preparing specific foods:
 Butter knife
 Cake fork
 Soup spoon
 Crab cracker
 Crab fork
 Fish knife
 Fondue fork
 Grapefruit knife
 Grapefruit spoon
 Lobster pick
 Snail tongs and forks
 Nutcracker
 Ice cream scoop
 Tongs for:
 Sugar
 Asparagus
 Honey dipper
 Meat claws (used to shred barbecue meats such as brisket)

Combination utensils

Over time, traditional utensils have been modified in various ways in attempts to make eating more convenient or to reduce the total number of utensils required.
 Chopfork – A utensil with a fork at one end and chopsticks/tongs at the other.
 Chork – Pointed and slightly curved tongs, which can be used like chopsticks (as pincers) or as a fork (for spearing). A different kind of chork is a fork with a split handle, which can be broken in half to make two chopsticks.
 Forkchops – Used in a pair, these are basically a pair of chopsticks with a small fork and knife on the non-pointed ends.
 Spoon and Chopstick Hybrid – Pointed and slightly curved tongs, which can be used like chopsticks or as a spoon.
 Knife and Chopstick Hybrid – Pointed and slightly curved tongs, which can be used like chopsticks or as a knife.
 Knork – A knife with a single tine, sharpened or serrated, set into the anterior end of the blade. (from knife and fork)
 Pastry fork – A fork with a cutting edge along one of the tines.
 Spoon straw – A scoop-ended drinking straw intended for slushies and milkshakes.
 Sporf – A utensil consisting of a spoon on one end, a fork on the other, and edge tines that are sharpened or serrated.
 Spork – Spoon and fork
 Splayd – Spoon and fork and knife
 Spife – Spoon and knife.

Disposable utensils
Prepackaged products may come with a utensil intended to be consumed or discarded after using it to consume the product. For instance, some single-serve ice cream is sold with a flat wooden spade, often erroneously called a "spoon", to lift the product to one's mouth. Prepackaged tuna salad or cracker snacks may contain a flat plastic spade for similar purposes.

See also

References 

Food- and drink-related lists